John Bailey McElfatrick (1828–1906) was an architect known for his design of theaters in the United States and Canada. He eventually went into practice with his sons William H. McElfatrick and John Morgan McElfatrick (1853-1891) in the firm J. B. McElfatrick & Sons.

McElfatrick established a practice in 1851 in Harrisburg and Philadelphia after studying architecture and engineering with his father Edward McElfatrick. The firm expanded to St Louis, Cleveland, and Chicago and also designed theaters in Ottawa and Montreal. He is credited with the design of more than 100 theaters and for instituting improved sight lines, multiple exits, fire sprinkler systems, and continuous rows of seating without aisles on the ground floor.

His work includes the Central Colored School at 542 West Kentucky Street in Louisville, Kentucky. It is listed on the National Register of Historic Places.

Several theaters that he designed remain in use.

Work
Brooklyn Academy of Music's BAM Harvey Theater in Brooklyn, New York (open)
Colonial Theatre in Pittsfield, Massachusetts
Metropolitan Opera House in Philadelphia, Pennsylvania (open)	
Miller Symphony Hall in Allentown, Pennsylvania (open), by William H. McElfatrick
National Theatre in Washington, D.C., an earlier building
New Victory Theatre in New York City (open)
Waynesburg Theater & Arts Center in Waynesburg
Bijou Theatre (1883) at 1239 Broadway
Harlem Opera House (1889)
Holyoke Opera House (1894, refurbishing of galleries and stage)
Hammerstein's Olympia (1895)
Harlem Alhambra (1905)
Manhattan Opera House (1906)
Gayety Theater (Baltimore) (1906) in Baltimore, Maryland
Howard Auditorium Music Hall (Baltimore) (1895) in Baltimore, Maryland

References

1828 births
1906 deaths
19th-century American architects